The 2018 Libyan Cup is the 22nd edition of the Libyan knockout football competition since its inception in 1976. The tournament returned after not being held in 2017, and started in January 2018.

Round of 64

|-
!colspan=3|28 Jan 2018

|-
!colspan=3|29 Jan 2018

|-
!colspan=3|30 Jan 2018

|-
!colspan=3|31 Jan 2018

|-
!colspan=3|1 Feb 2018

|-
!colspan=3|3 Feb 2018

|-
!colspan=3|4 Feb 2018

|-
!colspan=3|5 Feb 2018

|-
!colspan=3|7 Feb 2018

|-
!colspan=3|5 Mar 2018

|}

Round of 32

|-
!colspan=3|3 Mar 2018

|-
!colspan=3|4 Mar 2018

|-
!colspan=3|5 Mar 2018

|-
!colspan=3|6 Mar 2018

|-
!colspan=3|7 Mar 2018

		
|-
!colspan=3|8 Mar 2018

|-
!colspan=3|9 Mar 2018

|-
!colspan=3|11 Mar 2018

|-
!colspan=3|12 Mar 2018

|-
!colspan=3|18 Mar 2018

|}

Round of 16

|-
!colspan=3|6 Apr 2018

|-
!colspan=3|7 Apr 2018

|-
!colspan=3|8 Apr 2018

|-
!colspan=3|10 Apr 2018

|-
!colspan=3|12 Apr 2018

|}

Quarter-finals

|-
!colspan=3|27 Apr 2018

|-
!colspan=3|4 May 2018

|-
!colspan=3|5 May 2018

|}

Semi-finals

|-
!colspan=3|12 Jun 2018

|-
!colspan=3|TBA

|}

Note: Original match on 21 Jun 2018 between Alahly Tripoli and Alittihad ended 0 : 0, and was suspended during the penalty shoot-out. The Libyan Football Federation decided to replay the match on 8 July 2018, but Alahly Tripoli decided not to play.

Final

|-
!colspan=3|16 Jul 2018

|}

References

External links
Libyan Cup 2017/2018, Goalzz.com

Libya
Cup
Libyan Football Cup